Kigoma Airport  is an airport in western Tanzania serving Kigoma. It is located at the east area of Ujiji. The government of Tanzania is planning to improve the airport. The Kigoma non-directional beacon (Ident: KG) is located on the field. Ground handling at the airport is conducted by the Livingstone Aviation Services Limited.

Airlines and Destinations

Gallery

Accidents and incidents
9 April 2012: Air Tanzania de Havilland Canada Dash 8-300 5H-MWG was written off after an aborted take off. All 39 people on board survived.

See also

 List of airports in Tanzania
 Transport in Tanzania

References

External links
OpenStreetMap - Kigoma
OurAirports - Kigoma

 

Airports in Tanzania
Buildings and structures in the Kigoma Region